

The  BJ-1 Dyna Mite, or California Sailplanes Duster was a sailplane designed by Ben Jansson in the United States in the 1960s for homebuilding.

Design and development
A conventional shoulder-wing design with conventional empennage, no component of the BJ-1 exceeds 18 ft (5.5 m) in length, in order to facilitate building and storage in a domestic garage. Construction throughout was of wood, apart from a few mouldings (like the nosecone) made of fiberglass. The BJ-1 Dyna Mite first flew in 1966.

The rough building sketches from Ben Janssons prototype design from 1963, were refined by Hank Thor and the BJ-1B Duster plans were released in 1971 featuring a lighter weight, extended wingspan and a lower canopy that required the pilot to fly it semi-reclined. By 1977, more than 200 sets of plans had been sold. In total 371 sets of plans were sold and DSK (Duster Sailplane Kits) sold about 169 kits.

Variants
BJ-1 'Dyna Mite'
BJ-1B 'Duster'

Aircraft on display
US Southwest Soaring Museum - prototype

Specifications (BJ-1B)

References

External links
 http://www.fiddlersgreen.net/AC/aircraft/Duster-Sailplane/duster.php
 https://web.archive.org/web/20070617044316/http://www.sailplanedirectory.com/PlaneDetails.cfm?planeID=94

1960s United States sailplanes
Homebuilt aircraft
Aircraft first flown in 1966